The Deora is a 1965 Dodge A100 pickup truck that was heavily customized by Mike and Larry Alexander in Detroit for the 1967 Detroit Autorama. After winning many awards, including the Ridler in 1967, it became the prototype for a Hot Wheels car, and plastic model kit. It was sold at auction in 2009 for US$324,500.

Design
The Alexander brothers commissioned the design from Harry Bentley Bradley in 1964. It was unveiled in their home town during the Detroit Autorama in 1967, where it won nine awards including the Ridler Award. The Deora is based on the compact Dodge A100 pickup.  The back hatch of a 1960 Ford station wagon served as the windshield. It was chopped, sectioned, and channelled to create the fully functional, futuristic-looking pickup. The slant six engine and 3-speed manual transmission were moved rearward 15 inches, out of the cab and into the bed and covered by the hard tonneau. Entry into the gold-painted custom is achieved by lifting up the windshield, swivelling the lower gate and entering through the front.

The name Deora came from a naming contest run by AMT model cars. Harry Bradley had proposed to call it XTAB (standing for eXperimental Truck Alexander Brothers).  The winning entry was from a 13-year-old boy. The idea for the name "Deora" came from taking the "b" out of Debora, his girlfriend at the time, although many people assume that it came from and is a technically incorrect version of the Spanish word for “golden”.

Chrysler liked the resulting truck so well that they leased it for two years to display with their other factory concept cars. It was then put into storage after being sold to Al Davis. His son took the Deora out of storage in 1998 and Harry Bradley was asked to help restore it. The finished restoration took part in the 50th-anniversary Detroit Autorama in 2002 as part of a special display of classic Alexander brothers customs.

In 2009 the Deora was put up for auction in California and was sold for $324,500. It was described as featuring a  6-cylinder  engine.

Hot Wheels
The Deora is also a major player in Hot Wheels history.  It was part of the very first Hot Wheels line in 1968.  In 2000, Hot Wheels released the Deora II, an update of the original. The vehicle is also Vert Wheeler's signature car in Hot Wheels: World Race and the AcceleRacers series.

Three years later, in preparation for Hot Wheels' 35th anniversary, a full size Deora II was unveiled.  It was built by Chip Foose and fiveaxis, and sports a Cadillac Northstar V8 engine.

In 2021, Mattel released a Hot Wheels car called the Deora III. However, its more open design causes it to resemble its two predecessors less than they resemble each other. It still has a surfboard in the back, as well as a bicycle.

References

Vehicles introduced in 1967
Dodge vehicles
Individual cars
One-off cars
DIY culture
Automotive styling features
Visual arts media